Haa Dhaalu Atoll Education Centre, originally named Haa Dhaalu Community School, is a government school in The Maldives. The foundation stone was laid by Haa Dhaalu Atoll Chief Thiyara Mohamed Rasheed on 18 March 1978, and the school was opened on 1 March 1979. This school was opened by President Maumoon Abdul Gayoom on 1 March 1979.

Schools in the Maldives
1979 establishments in the Maldives
Educational institutions established in 1979